"Tooth and Consequences" is the third and final segment of the sixteenth episode from the first season (1985–86) of the television series The Twilight Zone. In this segment, a terminally depressed dentist is granted his greatest desire by the tooth fairy.

Plot
Dentist Myron Mandel has problems with self-esteem. He even feels the necessity to discuss it with office neighbor Walter Pinkham who is a psychiatrist. Mandel states that it feels like his patients shrink from his touch but the psychiatrist shoos him out of his office after attempting to convince him to let it go. Upon returning to his own office, Mandel tells his receptionist to send home the waiting patients, and he claims he is sick. The receptionist has had enough of his self-loathing and quits her job. Mandel goes out and dismisses his patients and says that he's going to do missionary work with Eskimos. In reality, however, he makes the decision to commit suicide.

As he tries to hang himself, a patient named Lydia comes to the office looking for a hairbrush that she lost the day before. Mandel gets the nerve to ask her out but she rejects him. After Lydia leaves, he again tries to hang himself but the light fixture breaks. He is caught by a burly man who identifies himself as the tooth fairy. When the tooth fairy asks Mandel if he can do anything for him, he wishes that Lydia would fall madly in love with him and that all of his patients would like him. His wish is granted, and yet it does not turn out as he had hoped. He becomes tired and overworked and Lydia constantly wants to make love. Mandel decides to run away from his new life and boards a freight train. On the train are a group of hobos who identify themselves as ex-dentists. They tell him that, with them not around, the tooth fairy gets more business.

External links
 

1986 American television episodes
The Twilight Zone (1985 TV series season 1) episodes

fr:Les Dents et la Sagesse